Elizabeth Arquin Walker is an American diabetes nurse scientist who is emeritus Professor of Medicine at the Albert Einstein College of Medicine. Her research considers how people with diabetes may better manage their disease. In 2000 she served as the President of the American Diabetes Association. She is a Fellow of the American Association of Diabetes Educators.

Early life and education 
Walker earned her bachelor's degree at Chestnut Hill College. She moved to South Bend, Indiana for her graduate studies, where she earned a master's degree. She moved to Creighton University, Omaha, Nebraska for a bachelor's degree in nursing. After graduating, Walker worked as a nurse in the University of Nebraska Medical Center. When her husband's career forced her to move to New Haven, Connecticut, she became a visiting nurse. In this capacity she witnessed first hand how important it was for diabetic patients to be able to manage their own health.v She held various hospital positions in Connecticut, including at the Yale School of Nursing, before starting her doctoral research. In 1988 Walker completed her PhD at the Catholic University of America.

Research and career 
After earning her doctorate Walker joined the State University of New York as an Associate Professor of Nursing. She moved to the Albert Einstein College of Medicine in 1990, where she was eventually promoted to Professor in 2004. Her research considered evidence-based approaches to improve the self-management of diabetes. She has shown that regular telephone counselling can serve as a high impact, low cost tool to lower blood sugar in adults with uncontrolled diabetes. Unfortunately, printed self management tools are not sufficient to improve the control of diabetes.

In 2016 Walker was awarded a multi-million dollar grant from the National Science Foundation to launch a centre that focussed on transnational diabetes research. The centre has a particular focus on the health of people from low-income communities and marginalised ethnic groups. Whilst Walker initially focused on diabetes control in New York City, she soon shifted her focus to global health, with a particular focus on Uganda.

Walker worked with the Centers for Disease Control and Prevention to implement the Power Up for Health lifestyle intervention programme which looked to prevent diabetes in high-risk individuals. The programme was offered in recreation centres across New York City and delivered by multi-lingual lifestyle coaches. Over the sixteen week intervention, participants reported weight loss of ~ 5%, as well as improvement in healthy eating and fewer depressive symptoms.

Awards and honors 
Walker was elected President of the American Diabetes Association in 1999. She was awarded the Creighton University Alumni Merit Award in 2002. She was elected Fellow of the American Association of Diabetes Educators in 2008. In 2016 Walker was awarded the American Diabetes Association Richard R. Rubin award.

Selected publications

References 

Living people
Year of birth missing (living people)
American nurses
American women nurses
Chestnut Hill College alumni
State University of New York faculty
University of Notre Dame alumni
Creighton University alumni
Catholic University of America alumni
Albert Einstein College of Medicine faculty
American women academics
21st-century American women